Maseno is a town in Kisumu, the third largest city in Kenya. It is located along Kisumu - Busia highway 25 kilometers to the provincial capital and it is in north west ward. Another road connects Maseno to Vihiga town, located 15 kilometers east of Maseno. The equator passes through Maseno. Kombewa is located 10 kilometers west of Maseno. The altitude of Maseno is 1,503 metres or 4,934 feet above sea level.

Maseno division has a population of 65,304, of whom 2,199 are classified as urban according to the 1999 census. Maseno is part of Kisumu county council and Kisumu Rural Constituency.

Maseno University has its main campus located in Maseno town. This university is the largest contributor to the economy of Maseno Town. This occurs in two main ways. First, Maseno University employs most of its staff from among the residents of Maseno Town. Secondly, Maseno University students spend most of their allowances purchasing food, entertainment, other basic life services like hairdressing, and paying rents in Maseno town.

Maseno is the birthplace of Raila Odinga, a Kenyan politician, and Pamela Mboya.

References 

Kisumu County
Populated places in Nyanza Province